Mastigoproctus is a genus of whip scorpions. Despite popular belief, they are not venomous as, like all other whip scorpions, they do not possess venom glands.

Species
, the World Uropygi Catalog accepts the following seventeen species:
Mastigoproctus abeli Villarreal & Giupponi, 2009 – Venezuela
Mastigoproctus annectens Werner, 1916 – Brazil
Mastigoproctus ayalai Viquez & Armas, 2007 – Venezuela
Mastigoproctus baracoensis Franganillo, 1931 – Cuba
Mastigoproctus brasilianus (C. L. Koch, 1843) – Brazil
Mastigoproctus butleri Pocock, 1894 – Brazil
Mastigoproctus cinteotl Barrales-Alcalá, Francke & Prendini, 2018 – Mexico
Mastigoproctus colombianus Mello-Leitão, 1940 – Colombia
Mastigoproctus formidabilis Hirst, 1912 – Venezuela
Mastigoproctus giganteus (Lucas, 1835) – United States
Mastigoproctus lacandonensis Ballesteros & Francke, 2006 – Mexico
Mastigoproctus maximus (Tarnani, 1889) – Brazil
Mastigoproctus minensis Mello-Leitão, 1931 – Brazil
Mastigoproctus perditus Mello-Leitão, 1931 – Brazil
Mastigoproctus proscorpio (Latreille, 1806) – Dominican Republic, Haiti, Martinique
Mastigoproctus santiago Teruel, 2010 – Cuba
Mastigoproctus vandevenderi Barrales-Alcalá, Francke & Prendini, 2018 – Mexico

References

External links

Arachnid genera
Uropygi
Arthropods of South America